A town is an urban municipality status type used in the Canadian province of Alberta. Alberta towns are created when communities with populations of at least 1,000 people, where a majority of their buildings are on parcels of land smaller than 1,850 m2, apply to Alberta Municipal Affairs for town status under the authority of the Municipal Government Act.  Applications for town status are approved via orders in council made by the Lieutenant Governor in Council under recommendation from the Minister of Municipal Affairs.

Alberta has 105 towns that had a cumulative population of 455,053 and an average population of 4,293 in the 2016 Canadian Census. Alberta's largest and smallest towns are Okotoks and Stavely with populations of 28,881 and 541 respectively. Diamond Valley is Alberta's newest town, which incorporated on January 1, 2023 via amalgamation of the former towns of Black Diamond and Turner Valley.

When a town's population exceeds 10,000 people, the council may request a change to city status, but the change in incorporated status is not mandatory. Towns with populations less than 1,000, whether their populations have declined below 1,000 or they were incorporated as towns prior to the minimum 1,000 population requirement, are permitted to retain town status.

A total of 699 elected town officials (107 mayors and 592 councillors) provide town governance throughout the province.

The highest frequency of towns in Alberta is found in the Queen Elizabeth II Highway/Highway 2A corridor between Calgary and Edmonton corridor including, from south to north, Crossfield, Carstairs, Didsbury, Olds, Bowden, Innisfail, Penhold, Blackfalds, Ponoka and  Millet.

Administration 
Pursuant to Part 5, Division 1 of the Municipal Government Act (MGA), each municipality created under the authority of the MGA is governed by a council. As a requirement of the MGA, a town council consists of an odd number of councillors, one of which is the town's chief elected official (CEO) or mayor. A town council consists of seven councillors by default, but it can consist of a higher or lower odd number if council passes a bylaw altering its size (so long as it does not consist of fewer than three councillors). For the 2017–2021 term, 82 towns have a council of seven, and 25 have a council of five.

Town councils are governed by a mayor and an even number of councillors that are elected by popular vote, resulting in a total odd number of members to avoid tie votes on council matters. All council members are elected under the provisions of the Local Authorities Election Act (LAEA). Mayoral or councillor candidates are required to be residents of their municipality for a minimum of six consecutive months prior to nomination day. The last municipal election was October 16, 2017.

Alberta Municipal Affairs, a ministry of the Cabinet of Alberta, is charged with coordination of all levels of local government.

Administrative duties of towns include public safety, local transit, roads, water service, drainage and waste collection, as well as coordination of infrastructure with provincial and regional authorities (including road construction, education, and health).

List 
The below table is a list of only those urban municipalities in Alberta that are incorporated as towns.

The municipalities of Crowsnest Pass and Jasper are not listed because they are incorporated as specialized municipalities, not towns. For more information on specialized municipalities, see Specialized municipalities of Alberta.

New towns 
New town is a former urban municipal status in Alberta that is no longer in use. The authority to incorporate a community as a new town came from The New Towns Act, which was chapter 39 of the Statutes of Alberta, 1956.

At least 12 communities incorporated as a new town between 1956 and 1967. Cynthia and Drayton Valley were the first communities in Alberta to incorporate as new towns on June 1, 1956. Drayton Valley did so after only six months of incorporation as a village, and was also the community that operated under new town status for the shortest period – eight months from June 1, 1956, to February 1, 1957.

The last community to incorporate as a new town was Fox Creek on July 19, 1967. Fox Creek was previously unincorporated prior to this date. It remained a new town for just over sixteen years until September 1, 1983, when it changed to town status.

Rainbow Lake was the last community to be recognized as a new town. Its status was changed to that of a town in 1994 when numerous former acts under the authority of Alberta Municipal Affairs were transitioned into the current Municipal Government Act. Rainbow Lake was also the community that operated under new town status for the longest period – nearly 28 years from September 1, 1966, to May 2, 1994.

Other communities that applied for new town status included Slave Lake and Smith. Slave Lake applied, despite already being incorporated, to access additional provincial funding but the application was denied by the provincial cabinet. In the case of Smith, after applying in 1968, its application was denied after the province's feasibility study for the community determined Smith was unlikely to attract further economic development.

Below is a list of the 12 communities that were once incorporated as a new town. All but one of them are resource communities in northern or west–central Alberta and were recently founded communities at their dates of incorporation as new towns. St. Albert was the only community that was not in northern or west–central Alberta and had been incorporated as its own municipality since December 7, 1899.

Former towns 
All cities in Alberta and the former cities of Fort McMurray and Strathcona previously held town status in their histories. Other communities that previously held town status include Beverly, Big Valley, Blairmore, Bowness, 
Black Diamond, Carmangay, Coleman, Cynthia, Diamond City, Forest Lawn, Gleichen, Grande Cache, Grand Centre, Grouard, Irvine, Jasper Place, Lac La Biche, Lodgepole, Montgomery, Turner Valley and Youngstown. Of these, the villages of Big Valley, Carmangay and Youngstown are the only communities that remain incorporated municipalities. The others either amalgamated to form other municipalities (Blairmore, Coleman, Grand Centre and Lac La Biche), were absorbed through annexation by Calgary (Bowness, Forest Lawn and Montgomery) or Edmonton (Beverly and Jasper Place) or dissolved to become hamlets under the jurisdiction of municipal districts (Cynthia, Diamond City, Gleichen, Grande Cache, Grouard, Irvine and Lodgepole).

Town status eligibility 
The villages of Stirling, Duchess, and Alberta Beach, with population counts of 1,269, 1,085, and 1,018 respectively, meet the legislated population requirements for town status. There are also at least ten hamlets – Cardiff, Clairmont, Dunmore, Fort Chipewyan, Grande Cache, La Crete, Lac La Biche, Langdon, Springbrook, and Wabasca – that meet the population requirements for town status.

City status eligibility 
There are currently nine towns – Blackfalds, Canmore, Cochrane, High River, Okotoks, Stony Plain, Strathmore, Sylvan Lake and Whitecourt – that are eligible for city status having populations in excess of 10,000. In addition, the Town of Hinton has expressed interest in incorporating as a city once it surpasses 10,000 people. Its population in 2016 was 9,882. In 2016, the Town of Morinville conducted a municipal census in which it anticipated the town would surpass 10,000; thus the town investigated city status as well as a specialized municipality model with Sturgeon County. The census reported a population of 9,893, which was 107 people shy of the milestone.

Gallery

Notes

See also 
List of census divisions of Alberta
List of cities in Alberta
List of communities in Alberta
List of hamlets in Alberta
List of municipal districts in Alberta
List of municipalities in Alberta
List of population centres in Alberta
List of summer villages in Alberta
List of villages in Alberta

References

External links 
 Alberta Municipal Affairs
 Alberta Urban Municipalities Association

 
Towns